A number describes quantity and assesses multitude.

Number and numbers may also refer to:

Mathematics and language
 Grammatical number, a morphological grammatical category indicating the quantity of referents
 Number Forms, a Unicode block containing common fractions and Roman numerals
 Nominal number, a label to identify an item uniquely
 Number theory, a mathematical discipline
 Numbering scheme, a method of assigning numbers to items
 Numeral system, a writing system for expressing numbers
 Numeral (linguistics), words or phrases that describe a numerical quantity 
 Number sign, a

Literature
 Book of Numbers, part of the Torah; the fourth book of the Bible
 Number (magazine), a Japanese sports magazine
 Numbers (magazine), a literary magazine published in Cambridge, England
 Numbers: The Universal Language, a 1996 illustrated book by Denis Guedj
 The Number, a book by Jonny Steinberg

Entertainment
 "Numbers" (Lost), an episode of Lost
 The Numbers (Lost), the numbers 4, 8, 15, 16, 23, 42 in Lost
 Numbers (Nanoha), a group of characters in Magical Girl Lyrical Nanoha StrikerS
 Numbers (TV series) (stylised as Numb3rs), an American TV series
 The Numbers (website), a website that tracks box office revenue and film sales 
 Numbers monsters, a set of cards in Yu-Gi-Oh! Zexal
 Numbers, a play by Kieron Barry
 Numbers, a character in the Dick Tracy franchise
 A Number, a 2002 play by the English playwright Caryl Churchill
 Numbers, a historic nightclub in the Montrose neighborhood of Houston, Texas
 The Number (film), a 2017 South African film
 Numbers (South Korean TV series), a 2023 television series

Music
 Number (music)
 Number opera, an opera consisting of individual musical numbers
 Numbers (American band), an American indie rock/electronic group
 The Numbers Band, an American rock group
 The Numbers (band), an Australian rock group
 Numbers (record label), a Scottish record label

Albums
 Numbers (Cat Stevens album) (1975)
 Numbers (Rufus album) (1979)
 Numbers (The Briggs album) (2003)
 Numbers (Days Difference album) (2007)
 Number(s) (Woe, Is Me album) (2010)
 Numbers (MellowHype album) (2012)

Songs
 "Numbers" (Kraftwerk song), from the 1981 album Computer World
 "Numbers", a song by Soft Cell from their 1983 album The Art of Falling Apart
 "Numbers", a song by Basshunter from his 2009 album Bass Generation
 "Numbers", a song by Skepta featuring Pharrell Williams from the album Konnichiwa
 "The Numbers", a song by Radiohead from their 2016 album A Moon Shaped Pool
 "Numbers", a song by Melanie Martinez from her 2020 deluxe album K-12
 "Numbers", a song by Weezer from their 2021 album OK Human

People with the name
 Ronald Numbers (born 1942), an American professor and historian of science

Other uses
 Numbers (spreadsheet), a spreadsheet application developed by Apple as part of its iWork suite
 Number (periodicals), a number to indicate a particular issue of a periodical
 Number (sports), a number assigned to an athlete
 Telephone number or number
 Numbers game, a gambling scheme common in poor U.S. urban neighborhoods
 Numbers station, a spy radio station
 The Numbers Gang, a prison gang in South Africa
 Preferred number or preferred value in industrial design  
 Describing something having greater numbness
 , or My Number in Japan, is a 12-digit ID number that has been issued to all citizens and residents of Japan since late 2015.

See also

 :Category: Numbers